Cristiano Citton (born 25 October 1974) is an Italian former track cyclist. He is a two-time world team pursuit champion, winning the event in 1996 and 1997. He also competed at the 1996 and 2000 Summer Olympics.

Major results

1996
 1st  Team pursuit, World Track Championships
1997
 1st  Team pursuit, World Track Championships
 1st Six Days of Bassano del Grappa (with Andrea Colinelli)
1998
 3rd Team pursuit, World Track Championships
 World Cup Classics
1st Team pursuit, Hyères
1999
 World Cup Classics
2nd Team pursuit, Fiorenzuola d'Arda
3rd Team pursuit, Valencia
2000
 World Cup Classics
1st Team pursuit, Turin

Road

1996
 1st  Overall Olympia's Tour
1st Stage 2a
1997
 1st Gran Premio della Liberazione
 3rd Overall Olympia's Tour
1st Stage 3b

References

External links
 

1974 births
Living people
Italian male cyclists
Cyclists at the 1996 Summer Olympics
Cyclists at the 2000 Summer Olympics
Olympic cyclists of Italy
UCI Track Cycling World Champions (men)
Cyclists from the Province of Vicenza
Italian track cyclists
20th-century Italian people
21st-century Italian people